Finders Keepers is an American children's game show that debuted on Nickelodeon  in 1987 and later aired in first-run syndication starting in 1988. The show featured two teams of two children attempting to find hidden objects in different rooms of a house.

The Nickelodeon version premiered on November 2, 1987, and was hosted by Wesley Eure. Following this version's cancellation, Larry Toffler hosted a syndicated version that premiered on September 12, 1988.

Gameplay

Main Game

The main game was played in two rounds, each with two halves. The first half of each round involved finding hidden pictures in a complex drawing, and the second half involved ransacking rooms in a large house built on-stage.

Hidden Pictures round

In the first half of each round, the object for the teams was to find hidden pictures drawn into a larger picture based on clues given by the host. On the Nickelodeon series, the picture was displayed on a telestrator and the team used a light pen to circle the object. On the syndicated series the picture was displayed on the game board with plastic laminate stickers similar to Colorforms representing the objects, and the team had to run to the board and stick a laminate to the picture to show where the hidden object was.

Each correct item located earned $25 for the team and an opportunity to search one of four rooms in the house for that round. During the first half of the Nickelodeon series the players chose the rooms they wanted to search, but this was later changed so that each hidden object found awarded the opportunity to search a specific room.

Each picture had a maximum of six objects hidden within it. In the first half of the Nickelodeon series, an incorrect answer meant a room would go unclaimed. For the subsequent episodes and syndicated series, the round was played until all four rooms were claimed or all six clues were played.

Searching the house

The house consisted of eight rooms that could be whimsical versions of traditional rooms in a typical home (e.g., a living room, a bathroom, a den or a kitchen), or complete fantasy rooms, such as "Sherlock's Study," "Ali-Baba's bathroom", a sewer (which contained a pool of water), Tarzan's tree house, a pastry shop, or "Frankenstein's laboratory."

In each room, the host read a clue describing an object hidden within that room. The team had 30 seconds to find the object, and were given one chance to show it to the host once found. Each room in this round was worth $50, which went to the team if they found the object in the room. If the team either failed to find the correct object or showed an incorrect one to the host, the opposing team won the money. On the Nickelodeon version while the team was trying to find the item associated with the clue, the camera would discreetly zoom into that item. In the syndicated version, a picture of the room would appear at the bottom of the screen with the object the team having to find being marked with a flashing white X.

Rooms were frequently set up with distractions to hinder the teams' searches of finding the object, such as ping-pong balls falling onto them from cabinets or the ceiling, sprays of water or confetti, and (in later episodes) entire shelves collapsing.

Round two

The process repeated with a second hidden pictures round and set of rooms to search. The dollar values increased to $75 for finding a correct hidden picture and $100 for successfully finding a hidden object in a room.

One of the rooms in round two was the "Instant Prize Room". If a team was in the room, a bell would go off and the lights in the room would flash to indicate this. If they managed to find the hidden object in the Instant Prize Room, both teammates won a bonus prize in addition to the $100 for finding the object; the prize could only be claimed by the team in the Instant Prize Room. 

The team with the most money at the end of this round won the game and advanced to the Room to Room Romp. Both teams kept all money earned, the losing team receiving consolation prizes.

Tiebreaker

In the event that both teams were tied at the end of the second round, everyone went back to the play area and a shortened Hidden Pictures round was played. The first team to find two objects in the picture won.

Room-to-Room Romp

In the Room-to-Room Romp, the winning team had 90 seconds to find a hidden object in each of six rooms, in a sequence given to them before the round began. All six objects had tags attached, with each of the first five tags directing them to the next room and giving a clue for the object hidden there.

The team won a prize for each object found, increasing in value to a grand prize for getting through all six rooms within the time limit.

Broadcast history

The original version premiered on Nickelodeon on November 2, 1987, with Wesley Eure as host and John Harvey as the announcer. Harvey was later replaced by Bob Lorman and then by Joe Conklin. New episodes continued to air on Nickelodeon until July 29, 1988.

A first-run syndicated version, distributed by Fox Television Stations and Viacom premiered on September 12, 1988, and was hosted by Larry Toffler with Harry Stevens announcing. The syndicated series ended its run on March 10, 1989, and began airing in repeats on Nickelodeon the following Monday (March 13), which continued until August 25, 1990. Nick GAS re-aired the series from 1999 until 2006.

A Brazilian version of Finders Keepers, called "Bobeou Dançou", aired by Rede Globo from July to December 1989. This version was hosted by Brazilian star Xuxa.

A British version of Finders Keepers aired on the CITV block of ITV from 1991 to 1996, followed by a brief revival in 2006. The first five series of this version was presented by Neil Buchanan, who was joined in the last series by Diane Youdale. Jeff Brazier presented the revival.

Production information

The music for Finders Keepers was written by Edd Kalehoff. The music package was updated when the show went into syndication.

The first two seasons of Finders Keepers was taped at WHYY-TV in Philadelphia, Pennsylvania (as was Double Dare), while the syndicated version was taped at Hollywood Center Studios in Los Angeles, California. The sets of the Nickelodeon and syndicated versions differed slightly. The set of the Nickelodeon version consisted of a mock exterior of a house that included a door through which Eure entered at the beginning of the show. Prior to searching the house, the set would break away to reveal the house and rooms the teams would be searching. On the syndicated version, the play area and house shared the same set, with the house built stage left and the play area stage right.

Converse was a major sponsor of the show during its run, and every contestant and stage crew member (including the host) wore a pair of the company's shoes.

References

External links

1987 American television series debuts
1989 American television series endings
1980s American children's game shows
1980s Nickelodeon original programming
American television series revived after cancellation
First-run syndicated television programs in the United States
Nickelodeon game shows
English-language television shows
Television series about children
Television series by 20th Century Fox Television
Television series by CBS Studios
Television shows set in Philadelphia
Television shows set in Orange County, California
Television shows filmed in Pennsylvania
Television shows filmed in Los Angeles